Kaido Kreen (born on 12 January 1965 in Viljandi) is an Estonian volleyball player.

1986–1997 he was a member of Estonian volleyball team. 1988 and 1990 his club Tallinna Autobussikoondis won Estonian championships.

He participated in 1996 Atlanta Olympic Games where he played beach volleyball with Avo Keel. They shared the places 17.-24.

References

Living people
1965 births
Estonian men's volleyball players
Estonian beach volleyball players
Men's beach volleyball players
Beach volleyball players at the 1996 Summer Olympics
Olympic beach volleyball players of Estonia
Sportspeople from Viljandi